Lac La Hache Provincial Park is a provincial park in British Columbia, Canada, located on lake and near community of the same name in the South Cariboo region of that province.

The park is in the Interior Douglas Fir Zone, and an old-growth stand of Douglas-fir trees surrounds the campground. Sunlight reaching the forest floor allows the growth of trembling aspen, lodgepole pine, pinegrass, bunchberry and prickly rose.

References

Provincial parks of British Columbia
Geography of the Cariboo
Year of establishment missing